The 1958–59 NCAA football bowl games were a series of post-season games played in December 1958 and January 1959 to end the 1958 NCAA University Division football season. A total of 8 team-competitive games, and two all-star games, were played. The post-season began with the Bluegrass Bowl on December 13, 1958, and concluded on January 3, 1959, with the season-ending Senior Bowl.

Schedule

References